Geof Isherwood (born December 4, 1960) is an American painter, sculptor and comic book illustrator.

Career
Much of Isherwood's early work was done for Marvel Comics, including such titles as Silver Surfer, Conan the Barbarian, Daredevil, and Doctor Strange. Since then, he has been involved in movies as a storyboard artist and a concepts/production illustrator, working with the likes of Bryan Singer, Richard Donner and Darren Aronofsky. He has also painted and designed covers for Canadian publishers, including Ann Diamond's Dead White Males (2000) and Sand for Snow (2003) by Robert Edison Sandiford. In 2011, Isherwood illustrated and prepared the cover for the American novel Antiquitas Lost, by author Robert Louis Smith.  A selection of his paintings based on the Greek gods were featured in Issue 59 of the publication Matrix. In 1997, he created LINCOLN-16 (Skarwood Productions), a science fiction saga whose first two issues he wrote, drew, painted, and produced. Geof continues to work in the comic book field on a number of independent projects.

Personal life
In June 1988, Isherwood married poet Sonja Skarstedt. Sonja died in 2009 from cancer. In 2010, Geof met Amanda Muise of Pubnico, Nova Scotia. They were married September 30, 2011.

Teaching
Geof taught advanced comic book, figure drawing and concept art classes and workshops at Syn Studio Concept Art School from 2010 to 2013 an industry focused art school based in Montreal, Quebec. In 2015, Geof began teaching part-time at Algonquin College in Ottawa, Ontario, in the School Of Media And Design.

References

External links

Geof Isherwood at Lambiek's Comiclopedia

20th-century American painters
American male painters
21st-century American painters
American emigrants to Canada
Artists from Virginia
People from Quantico, Virginia
1960 births
Living people
American storyboard artists
20th-century American male artists